Vincent James (born 24 August 1915, date of death unknown) was a New Zealand cricketer. He played in six first-class matches for Canterbury from 1939 to 1945.

See also
 List of Canterbury representative cricketers

References

External links
 

1915 births
Year of death missing
New Zealand cricketers
Canterbury cricketers